The 1960 Rhode Island gubernatorial election was held on November 8, 1960. Democratic nominee John A. Notte Jr. defeated incumbent Republican Christopher Del Sesto with 56.64% of the vote.

Primary elections
Primary elections were held on September 28, 1960.

Democratic primary

Candidates
John A. Notte Jr., incumbent Lieutenant Governor
Armand H. Cote, former Lieutenant Governor

Results

General election

Candidates
John A. Notte Jr., Democratic 
Christopher Del Sesto, Republican

Results

References

1960
Rhode Island
Gubernatorial